General Whitehead may refer to:

Ennis Whitehead (1895–1964), U.S. Army Air Forces lieutenant general
Hayward Reader Whitehead (1855–1925), British Army major general